Sharafabad-e Mastufi (also Romanized as Sharafābād-e Mastūfī; also known as Sharafābād) is a village in Qeblehi Rural District, in the Central District of Dezful County, Khuzestan Province, Iran. At the 2006 census, its population was 59, in 11 families.

References 

Populated places in Dezful County